Unique Feature Identifier or UFI, also known as “UF”  is a geocode used for cities, towns, villages, and other geographic features. Generally, these are Static Unique Feature Identifiers (SUFI).

Notes

Geocodes